Hypericum humboldtianum is a species of shrubby flowering plant in the St. John's wort family Hypericaceae native to Colombia and Venezuela.

Taxonomy

The closest relative of Hypericum humboldtianum is Hypericum callacallanum in Peru, which has three-nerved sessile leaves and larger flowers.

Description

The orange to brown four-lined stems are ancipitous when young and become terete, with their cortex exfoliating in strips. The glaucous and coriaceous leaves have an acute to obtuse apex, a narrow base, and a sheathing pseudopetiole. Leaves have a single basal vein with or without lateral branches, and lack tertiary reticulation. The laminar glands are dense. The glands of the sepals are linear below, becoming punctiform in the upper third to upper half. The stigmas are capitate.

Distribution and habitat

In Colombia the shrub grows from Valle del Cauca to Norte de Santander and in Venezuela it grows in Mérida.

References

humboldtianum
Plants described in 1840